Lone Tree Brewery is an Israeli kosher brewery located near the Israeli settlement of Kfar Etzion in the Gush Etzion settlement bloc in the West Bank, a part of the occupied Palestinian territories.

History
Lone Tree brewery, which began selling beer commercially in 2010, was founded in 2009 by Myriam and David Shire and Susan and Yochanan Levin. The Shires originally lived in Glasgow, Scotland and moved to Gush Etzion in 1983; the Levins immigrated to the West Bank from Maryland, USA around 2006. David Shire, a biologist and resident of nearby Neve Daniel, worked at the Hadassah Medical Center in Jerusalem and later as a landscaper before finally pursuing his dream of establishing a boutique brewery.

Lone Tree brewery takes its name from the ancient oak tree that survived the Jordanian presence in Gush Etzion between 1949 and 1967 and that serves as a symbol of Gush Etzion. The same tree also inspired the company's logo.

Lone Tree manufacturing facility is housed in a 50-square-meter building in the center of Gush Etzion. According to Susan Levin, it is a destination for visitors from Tel Aviv and Haifa as well as from abroad.

Products
Lone Tree brewery has a weekly output of 250–300 bottles, or 800–900 bottles per month. It produces between seven and eight varieties of beer, including an oatmeal stout, an India pale ale, a California common, a Piraat-style ale, and a pomegranate ale. As of 2011, Lone Tree's beers are available primarily in the Gush Etzion area and in Jerusalem. They were featured at the BEERS conventions in Tel Aviv in 2011 and 2012, and they were featured at the 2012 Mateh Yehuda beer festival.

See also

Golan Brewery
List of microbreweries

References

External links
Audio interview with brewmaster David Shire in Arutz Sheva

Beer in the State of Palestine
Food and drink companies established in 2009
Israeli brands
Beer brands
Buildings and structures in the West Bank